Eider Batista (born 18 February 1981) is a Cuban rower. He competed in the men's lightweight double sculls event at the 2008 Summer Olympics.

References

1981 births
Living people
Cuban male rowers
Olympic rowers of Cuba
Rowers at the 2008 Summer Olympics
People from Holguín
Pan American Games medalists in rowing
Pan American Games gold medalists for Cuba
Pan American Games silver medalists for Cuba
Pan American Games bronze medalists for Cuba
Rowers at the 2003 Pan American Games
Rowers at the 2007 Pan American Games
Rowers at the 2011 Pan American Games
Medalists at the 2011 Pan American Games